Gwangnyeong Muk clan was one of the Korean clans. Their Bon-gwan was in Guangning County, China. According to the research in 2000, the number of Gwangnyeong Muk clan was 133. Muk clan was born in Liang County, China. He was a descendant of Mozi who was from Yang Province in China, and was a thinker from Lu in China’s Spring and Autumn period. He was naturalized in Joseon when he was a minister of defense (Bingbu Shangshu) in Ming dynasty.

See also 
 Korean clan names of foreign origin

References

External links 
 

 
Korean clan names of Chinese origin